The 2018–19 Segona Divisió, also known as Lliga Segona Divisió Sènior, was the 20th season of second-tier football in Andorra. The season began on 15 September 2018 and ended on 19 May 2019.

After winning the league in the previous season, Ordino were promoted to the 2018–19 Primera Divisió.

Format
Eleven clubs competed for the league title. The clubs played each other twice for a total of 18 matches for each club. The three "B" teams could not be promoted. Six clubs then advanced to a play-off to determine which would earn promotion.

League table

Results

Play–off round

Results

See also
2018–19 Primera Divisió
2019 Copa Constitució

References

External links
 

Segona Divisió seasons
2018–19 in Andorran football
Andorra